2002–03 Országos Bajnokság I (men's water polo) was the 97th water polo championship in Hungary.

First stage 

Pld - Played; W - Won; L - Lost; PF - Points for; PA - Points against; Diff - Difference; Pts - Points.

Championship Playoff

Final
1st leg

2nd leg

Final standing

Sources 
Magyar sportévkönyv 2004

Seasons in Hungarian water polo competitions
Hungary
2002 in water polo
2002 in Hungarian sport
2003 in water polo
2003 in Hungarian sport